Festivals in Ghana are celebrated for many reasons pertaining to a particular tribe or culture, usually having backgrounds relating to an occurrence in the history of that culture. Examples of such occurrences have been hunger, migration, purification of either gods or stools, etc.

Reasons for celebrating festivals
The importance of each festival's celebration includes:
 Planning developmental project. The festival is used as an occasions to meet and plan developmental projects in the area since most citizens are likely to attend.
 Purification of gods. The period is used to clean ancestral stools and perform important rites.
 Thanksgiving. The festival is used to thank the supreme God and the lesser gods for the guidance and protection
 National and political significance. Prominent people in the government are invited to explain government policies and programmes.
 Dispute resolution. The occasion is used to settle family and individual disputes for peaceful co-existence.
 To promote tourism. Some festivals celebrated in Ghana attract many foreign tourists to the country. An example is the Aboakyir festival. Tourism is the third foreign-exchange earner for Ghana.

List of traditional festivals and their month of celebration

Below is a list of all traditional, religious commemorative festivals celebrated throughout the year in Ghana. These may not entirely consist of festivals of Ghanaian descent.

Commemorating farming season
Kakube festival
Kobine Festival

Commemorating migration
Akwantukese Festival
Hogbetsotso festival

Religious
Akwasidae Festival
Aboakyer festival
Easter
Christmas
Eid al-Fitr
Eid al-Adha

Others
Agadevi (Have, Afadzato South District, Volta Region)
Agbamevo Festival
Ahobaa
Akwambo festival
Akwantutenten(Worawora, Volta Region)
Amu Festival
Apoor
Asafotu-fiam (Ada in the Eastern region)
Asafotufiam Festival
Asafua Festival
Asogli Yam Festival
Atu-Ho-Akye(Ejisu, Ashanti Region)
Ayimagonu Festival
Ayimagonu Festival
Bakatue festival
Beng Festival
Chale Wote Street Art Festival
Damba festival
Danso Abaim & Ntoa Fukokuese Festivals(Techimentia & Nkoranza, in the Brong Ahafo Region)
Dipo Festival (Manya Krobo, Yilo Krobo, Eastern Region)
Dzawuwu Festival
Dzohayem (Osudoku, Greater Accra)
Edina Buronya Festival
Eiok (War Festival)
Fetu Afahye
Fiok( Sandema by the Builsas)
Gbidukor Festival
Gbidukor Festival
Glimetoto Festival
Golob (Tengzung, Upper East Region)
Gologo festival
Gwolgu
Jintigi(All Gonja Towns, Northern Region)
Kente Festival(Bonwire, Ashanti Region)
Kobine
Kpalikpakpa zã (Kpalime Traditional Area in the Volta Region)
Kpini-Kyiu Festival(Wa & Tongu, in the Upper East Region)
Kpledjoo
Kundum Festival
Kwafie
Meet Me There Weekender
Mmoanniko Festival
Nkyidwo(Essumeja)
Ntoa Fokuose
Nyidwoo
Odambea Festival
Odwira festival
Paragbeile Festival
Rice festival (Akpafu, in the Volta Region)
Sasadu Festival
Sometutuza (Keta)
Tenghana Festival(Wa & Tongu, in the Upper East Region)]]
Tongu Upper East Region
Wilaa Festival (Takpo, Upper West Region)
Yaa Asantewaa Festival
Oti Region)]]
Ɔvazu Festival (Akposokubi) Oti Region, formally Volta/ Trans-Volta Togoland.

References

 
 L
 Festivals